The Brothers' Quarrel was a conflict between Rudolf II, Holy Roman Emperor and his brother, Matthias in the early 17th century. Their other brothersMaximilian III and Albert VIIand their cousinsespecially Ferdinand II and Leopold Vwere also deeply involved in their dispute. The family feud weakened the Habsburgs' position and enabled the Estates of their realms to win widespread political and religious concessions. The 19th-century Austrian writer, Franz Grillparzer, dedicated a play to the events.

References

Sources 

 
 

1600s in the Habsburg monarchy
1610s in the Habsburg monarchy
Rudolf II, Holy Roman Emperor
Feuds
Sibling rivalry

de:Bruderzwist